Leonard Maw (sometimes seen as "Mawe" (c. 1552 – 1629, Chiswick) was a Bishop of Bath and Wells and a Master of Peterhouse, Cambridge and Trinity College, Cambridge.

Life

He was born in Rendlesham, Suffolk, the son of Simon Maw (sometimes seen as  "Mawe") born Epworth, Lincolnshire, c. 1531 and Margery Wylde born Selby, Yorkshire, c. 1522.

He gained a BA degree from Peterhouse in 1592 and was elected a fellow in 1594, later becoming Master of Peterhouse on 16 November 1617. In 1621, he served as Prebend of Wells. He also served as Vice-Chancellor to the University of Cambridge from 1621 to 1622. Together with Matthew Wren, he accompanied Prince Charles to Madrid in search of a bride (the so-called Spanish Match). On acceding to the throne, Charles rewarded him by appointing him Master of Trinity College, Cambridge, which post he held until his death in 1629. From 1628 to 1629, he was also Bishop of Bath and Wells.

References

The Master of Trinity at Trinity College, Cambridge

1550s births
1629 deaths
Masters of Trinity College, Cambridge
Bishops of Bath and Wells
17th-century Church of England bishops
Fellows of Peterhouse, Cambridge
Masters of Peterhouse, Cambridge
17th-century English clergy
People from Suffolk Coastal (district)
Vice-Chancellors of the University of Cambridge